The 1992 congressional elections in Michigan was held on November 3, 1992 to determine who would represent the state of Michigan in the United States House of Representatives. Michigan had eighteen seats in the House, but lost two after being re-apportioned according to the 1990 United States Census, resulting in the state having sixteen seats. Representatives are elected for two-year terms.

Overview

References

1992 Michigan elections
1992
Michigan